Unitech Limited is an Indian real estate investment company headquartered in New Delhi, and once claimed to be the largest real estate builder in the country.

The company is based in New Delhi and ranks 1484, in Forbes Global 2000 listing of the top 2000 public companies in the world by Forbes magazine, 32nd in India. Its construction business includes highways, roads, powerhouses, transmission lines, and it has residential projects called Unitech Cities/Uni World, in cities like Mumbai, Delhi, Kolkata , Bhubaneswar, Chennai, Hyderabad, Mohali, Bangalore, Kochi, Noida, Greater Noida, Agra, Lucknow, Varanasi, Gurgaon, and Ghaziabad.

Past Join Ventures: LG - Unitech Hyundai - Unitech Singapore Consortium - Unitech Carlson (Radission) - Unitech

History
Founded by 5 partners, Ramesh Chandra, Dr. S. P. Shrivastava, Dr. P K Mohanti, Dr. Ramesh Kapur and Dr. Bahri   originally formed as United Technical Consultant Private Ltd in 1972 as a soil investigation company.  They later moved into civil engineering contracts in 1974. The company began to enter into real estate in 1986, and started to increase focus on real estate in 2000. Few year back, it was India's second-largest listed real estate firm.

Unitech had formed a large joint venture with Norway-based Telenor Group to create Unitech Wireless Ltd., in August 2009, it secured a 50 billion rupee ($1 billion) loan from State Bank of India (SBI.BO) to fund its mobile phone network rollout.

In 2011, due to the 2G-spectrum controversy (explained below), the company got involved in a public spat due to which its Chairman Sanjay Chandra al while on bail over Telenor's pressure to do so, followed by news of Unitech's settlement of issues by agreeing to sell its entire stake in the Unitech Wireless to shift the business to a new entity owned by the former almost 1 year later and then Telenor shifted the erstwhile United Wireless' entire assets into a newly formed holding company as its majority-owned subsidiary Telewings Communications Services Pvt. Ltd., another joint-venture which 26% stake was owned by an investment firm named Lakshdeep Investments & Finance Pvt. Ltd. and rest of the 74% owned by Telenor directly, thus sealing the end of Unitech's presence into telecommunications so far, only after 15 days since last development.

Unitech Wireless is one of the accused in the 2G spectrum case. It is alleged that they were able to attain 2G licenses by bribing officials in the Indian Government even though they didn't have any previous telecom experience. As a fallout of this they had a total of 22 licenses cancelled by virtue of a court order, and their Managing Director Sanjay Chandra sent to jail.

In March 2017, Sanjay Chandra, who had been out on bail in the 2G case, and brother Ajay were arrested by the Economic Offences Wing of the Delhi Police for allegedly duping home-buyers in a Gurugram project. Till date both are in jail. On October 21, 2019, The Noida Authority has cancelled the allotment of a group housing property to crisis-hit realtor Unitech over non-payment of dues worth Rs 1,203 crore. In December 2019,  the apex court has asked the central government to take over the management of the company, Keeping in mind the interests of about 30 thousand home buyers. The court has also directed the government to investigate the matter from various agencies including the Enforcement Directorate (ED) after Unitech and its directors revealed that thousands of crores of flat buyers had been diverted by the forensic report. The court has also flatly refused to grant bail to Unitech directors Chandra brothers, the apex court has asked the government to appoint the current directors of Unitech as independent directors.

References

External links
 Unitech Group website
 Supreme Court mandated Claim Submission Portal for Unitech Buyers

Companies listed on the Bombay Stock Exchange
Real estate companies established in 1972
Construction and civil engineering companies of India
Real estate companies of India
Companies based in New Delhi
Economy of West Bengal
2G spectrum case
Construction and civil engineering companies established in 1972
Indian companies established in 1972